Fleck is a surname. Notable people with the surname include:

 Abbey Fleck, American inventor of the Makin' Bacon microwave oven bacon cooker in 1993
 Alexander Fleck (1889–1968), British chemist, FRS, born and educated in Glasgow
 Béla Fleck (born 1958), American banjo player
 Daniel Fleck, former Republican member of the Pennsylvania House of Representatives
 Fred Fleck (1892 – 1961), American assistant director 
 Jack Fleck (1921–2014), American professional golfer
 Jacob Fleck (1881–1953), Austrian film director
 James Fleck (born 1931), Canadian businessman and academic
 Jerry Fleck (1947–2003), American assistant director
 John Fleck (actor) (born 1951), American actor
 John Fleck (footballer) (born 1991), Scottish footballer
 Konrad Fleck, 13th century German poet
 Ludwik Fleck (1896–1961), Polish scientist and sociologist of science
 Luise Fleck (1873–1950), Austrian film director
 Mike Fleck, Republican member of the Pennsylvania House of Representatives 
 P. J. Fleck (born 1980), coach and former American football player
 Robbie Fleck (born 1975), former South African rugby union player
 Robert Fleck (born 1965), retired Scottish footballer
 Ryan Fleck (born 1976), American film director
 Stephen Fleck (1912–2002), American professor of psychiatry

Fictional characters:
 Kernel Fleck, protagonist in The Demonata series of books by Darren Shan

 Arthur Fleck, protagonist of Joker (2019) by Todd Phillips

See also 
 Baron Fleck, a peerage of the United Kingdom

English-language surnames
German-language surnames
Occupational surnames